Acton is an unincorporated community in Acton Township, Meeker County, Minnesota, United States, near Grove City and Litchfield.  The community is located along Meeker County Road 23 near State Highway 4 (MN 4).  County Road 32 is also in the immediate area.

History
 	
A post office called Acton was established in 1857, and remained in operation until 1904. The community was named after Acton, Ontario.

The Dakota War of 1862

The incident that sparked the Dakota War of 1862 took place near Acton on August 17, 1862. Four Mdewakantons (“dwellers at the spirit waters”) from Rice Creek Village in the Lower Sioux Agency, returning home from an unsuccessful hunt, had a confrontation with Robinson Jones, a settler. The result of the dispute was that the Mdewakantons shot and killed five settlers, including Jones.  

On September 3, a 55-man company of the newly-formed 10th Minnesota Volunteer Infantry Regiment was routed by a band of Dakota warriors near Acton. Led by Capt. Richard Strout, the regiment managed to break free and was pursued eight miles to Hutchinson. Six of the soldiers were killed and 23 wounded. The number of Dakota dead and wounded is not known.

References

Notes

Sources

Unincorporated communities in Minnesota
Unincorporated communities in Meeker County, Minnesota
1857 establishments in Minnesota Territory
Populated places established in 1857